Edwin Samuel Montagu PC (6 February 1879 – 15 November 1924) was a British Liberal politician who served as Secretary of State for India between 1917 and 1922. Montagu was a "radical" Liberal and the third practising Jew (after Sir Herbert Samuel and Sir Rufus Isaacs) to serve in the British cabinet.

Background and education
Montagu was the second son and sixth child of Samuel Montagu, 1st Baron Swaythling, by his wife Ellen, daughter of Louis Cohen. He was educated at Doreck College, Clifton College, the City of London School, University College London and Trinity College, Cambridge. At Cambridge, he was the first student president of the Cambridge University Liberal Club from 1902 to 1903. In 1902, he was also president of the Cambridge Union.

Political career

Montagu was elected Member of Parliament for Chesterton in 1906, a seat he held until 1918, and then represented Cambridgeshire until 1922. He served under H. H. Asquith as Under-Secretary of State for India from 1910 to 1914, as Financial Secretary to the Treasury from 1914 to 1915 and again from 1915 to 1916 and as Chancellor of the Duchy of Lancaster (with a seat in the Cabinet) in 1915 and 1916. In 1915 he was sworn of the Privy Council. In 1916 he was promoted to Minister of Munitions.

Montagu was a friend of Asquith, Gertrude Bell, Lord Lloyd, Maurice Hankey and Duff Cooper, with whom he dined frequently. When Hankey was promoted to the newly created post of Cabinet Secretary, he recommended Montagu as Minister for National Service, for which he was considered in December 1916 (the job was given in the end to Neville Chamberlain). Instead he was initially left out of David Lloyd George's coalition government in December 1916, but in August 1917 he was appointed Secretary of State for India. Montagu was not initially part of Lloyd George's inner circle, when he became Prime Minister, but he remained in office until his resignation in March 1922.

As Secretary of State, Montagu represented the interests of the British Empire and opposed the most strident Indian nationalists, calling S. Subramania Iyer the "Grand old man of South India." Montagu led the Indian delegation at the Paris Peace Conference in 1919, where he opposed plans for dividing Turkey (including the Greek occupation of Smyrna and the projected removal of the Sultan from Constantinople). On this subject, at the Council of Four on 17 May 1919, he introduced representatives of Muslim India (including the Aga Khan) and urged that Muslim peoples were beginning to see the Conference as "taking sides against Islam".

He was primarily responsible for the Montagu–Chelmsford Reforms which led to the Government of India Act 1919, committing the British to the eventual evolution of India towards dominion status.

Anti-Zionism
Montagu was the third practising British Jew to enter the Cabinet, the inner circle of government. He was strongly opposed to Zionism, which he called "a mischievous political creed", and opposed the Balfour Declaration of 1917, which he considered anti-Semitic and whose terms he managed to modify. In a memo to the Cabinet, he outlined his views on Zionism:...I assume that it means that Mahommedans [Muslims] and Christians are to make way for the Jews and that the Jews should be put in all positions of preference and should be peculiarly associated with Palestine in the same way that England is with the English or France with the French, that Turks and other Mahommedans in Palestine will be regarded as foreigners, just in the same way as Jews will hereafter be treated as foreigners in every country but Palestine. Perhaps also citizenship must be granted only as a result of a religious test. He was opposed by his cousin Herbert Samuel, a moderate Zionist who became the first High Commissioner of the British Mandate of Palestine.

Family

In 1912, Montagu accompanied the prime minister on holiday in Sicily. H. H. Asquith brought along his daughter Violet, and she in turn brought her friend Venetia Stanley, daughter of Edward Stanley, 4th Baron Stanley of Alderley. It appears that during this holiday, both men fell in love with Stanley.

During the next three years Asquith wrote more and more frequently to her, even during Cabinet meetings. At the same time, Montagu was attempting to court her, unsuccessfully proposing marriage in 1913. She liked him but did not reciprocate his love. Also, Montagu had to marry within his Jewish faith to keep his inheritance. Although Stanley was from a freethinking family and was not a devout Anglican, conversion to Judaism seemed too great a barrier. However, Asquith's epistolary obsession with Venetia and his constant demands for advice apparently became overwhelming even for this intelligent and well-read woman, keenly interested in politics as she was. As a result, she finally accepted Montagu's proposal on 28 April 1915. She converted to Judaism, and the couple were wed on 26 July 1915.

The marriage was unhappy and she had several affairs, including one with the press magnate Lord Beaverbrook. In 1923 a child was born: legally and socially Judith was Montagu's daughter, but she was probably fathered by William Humble Eric Ward. She grew up to befriend Princess Margaret during World War II and marry the American photographer Milton Gendel, with whom she created an artistic salon in Italy. They had one child, Anna Mathias (née Gendel), the god-daughter of Princess Margaret.

Despite his wife's affairs, Montagu's marriage lasted until his death in 1924. His cause of physical deterioration and death at the age of 45 was unknown, but was thought to be either blood poisoning or encephalitis.

See also
 Liberalism in the United Kingdom

References

Bibliography

External links

 

Secretaries of State for India
British Secretaries of State
Chancellors of the Duchy of Lancaster
Members of the Privy Council of the United Kingdom
Liberal Party (UK) MPs for English constituencies
Presidents of the Cambridge Union
British Jews
Edwin
People educated at the City of London School
1879 births
1924 deaths
Younger sons of barons
People educated at Clifton College
Alumni of Trinity College, Cambridge
Alumni of University College London
UK MPs 1906–1910
UK MPs 1910
UK MPs 1910–1918
UK MPs 1918–1922
Jewish British politicians
National Liberal Party (UK, 1922) politicians
Jewish anti-Zionism in the United Kingdom